Holt is an unincorporated community in San Joaquin County, California, United States. Holt has a post office with ZIP code 95234, which was established in 1902. The community was named after the Holt brothers, the founders of the Holt Manufacturing Company, which later became the Caterpillar company.

Climate
According to the Köppen Climate Classification system, Holt has a warm-summer Mediterranean climate, abbreviated "Csa" on climate maps.

References

Unincorporated communities in California
Unincorporated communities in San Joaquin County, California